This list of 1983 motorsport champions is a list of national or international auto racing series with a Championship decided by the points or positions earned by a driver from multiple races.

Open wheel racing

Karting

Sports car and GT

Touring car

Stock car racing

Rallying

Motorcycle

See also
 List of motorsport championships
 Auto racing

1983 in motorsport
1983